Arvo Jaakson (15 July 1942 in Halinga Parish – 10 August 2019) was an Estonian politician. He was a member of IX Riigikogu.

He has been a member of Estonian Centre Party.

References

1942 births
2019 deaths
Estonian Centre Party politicians
Members of the Riigikogu, 1999–2003
People from Põhja-Pärnumaa Parish
Tallinn University of Technology alumni